Albert Edwards Benjamin Hall (3 September 1918 – 3 February 1998) was a Welsh footballer who played as a forward in the Football League for Tottenham Hotspur and Plymouth Argyle.

Career
Hall played Second Division football for Tottenham Hotspur, having joined the club at the age of fourteen. He finished the 1938–39 season as the club's joint top-scorer (with Johnny Morrison) with 11 goals. During World War II, he guested for many clubs across the country: Port Vale, Short Brothers, Norwich City, Luton Town, Charlton Athletic, Chelsea, Reading, Millwall and Watford. After the war finished he returned to Joe Hulme's "Spurs", and helped the White Hart Lane club to a sixth-place finish in 1946–47. He then transferred to Plymouth Argyle, who were managed by former Spurs player Jack Tresadern. He made just nine appearances for the "Pilgrims" at the start of the 1947–48 season. He then left Home Park and moved into non-League football with Southern League side Chelmsford City.

References

1918 births
1998 deaths
Sportspeople from Barry, Vale of Glamorgan
Welsh footballers
Association football forwards
Tottenham Hotspur F.C. players
Port Vale F.C. wartime guest players
Norwich City F.C. wartime guest players
Luton Town F.C. wartime guest players
Charlton Athletic F.C. wartime guest players
Chelsea F.C. wartime guest players
Reading F.C. wartime guest players
Millwall F.C. wartime guest players
Watford F.C. wartime guest players
Plymouth Argyle F.C. players
Chelmsford City F.C. players
English Football League players
Southern Football League players